Kai Hermann (born 29 January 1938) is a German journalist, who contributed to the magazines Die Zeit, Der Spiegel, Twen, and Stern, and published multiple works including "La révolte des étudiants" and "Intervention décisive à Mogadiscio". He is also co-author of Christiane F.: Wir Kinder vom Bahnhof Zoo, with Horst Rieck.

He is a Theodor Wolff Prize laureate, and recipient of the Carl von Ossietzky Medal.

Filmography
 Christiane F. (1981)
 Circle of Deceit (1981)
  (1987)
 Engel & Joe (2001)

References 

German journalists
German male journalists
20th-century German journalists
21st-century German journalists
1938 births
Living people
German male writers